The Derby (German: Das Derby) is a 1919 German silent mystery sports film directed by Ewald André Dupont and starring Max Landa, Hermann Picha and Hanni Weisse.

The film's sets were designed by the art director Robert A. Dietrich.

Cast
 Max Landa as Detektiv
 Hermann Picha as Ike Thurton, Trainer
 Hanni Weisse as Daisy
 Hellmut Kraus  as Jockey
 Bram Meynadier as Fletcher
 Leo Connard
 Wilhelm Diegelmann
 Kurt Keller-Nebri
 Maria Stork

References

Bibliography
 Bock, Hans-Michael & Bergfelder, Tim. The Concise CineGraph. Encyclopedia of German Cinema. Berghahn Books, 2009.

External links

1919 films
Films of the Weimar Republic
German silent feature films
Films directed by E. A. Dupont
German mystery films
1919 mystery films
German black-and-white films
German horse racing films
1910s sports films
Silent mystery films
1910s German films
1910s German-language films
Silent sports films